The Spadolini II Cabinet, led by Giovanni Spadolini, was the 40th cabinet of the Italian Republic.

The government remained in office from 23 August 1982 to 1 December 1982. This government was also known as the "Photocopy government", as identical to the previous Spadolini Cabinet.

The cabinet fell due to the so-called "Lite delle comari" (godmothers' quarrel), i.e. a political conflict between the ministers Beniamino Andreatta and Rino Formica about the "divorce" between Minister of Treasury and Bank of Italy.

Party breakdown

Ministers and other members
 Italian Republican Party (PRI): prime minister, 1 minister, 3 undersecretaries
 Christian Democracy (DC): 15 ministers, 31 undersecretaries
 Italian Socialist Party (PSI): 7 ministers, 15 undersecretaries
 Italian Democratic Socialist Party (PSDI): 3 ministers, 5 undersecretaries
 Italian Liberal Party (PLI): 1 minister, 3 undersecretaries

Composition

References

Italian governments
Cabinets established in 1982
Cabinets disestablished in 1982
1982 establishments in Italy
1982 disestablishments in Italy